The politics of Karnataka is represented by three major political parties, the Indian National Congress, the Janata Dal (Secular) and the Bharatiya Janata Party. The Janata Dal (Secular) and Indian National Congress led coalition government was in power in the state since May 2018 till July 2019. H.D. Kumaraswamy of the Janata Dal (Secular) was the chief Minister from 23 May 2018 to 23 July 2019.
Now Basavaraj Bommai of BJP is incumbent, forming the government since 26 July 2019

In national politics
Karnataka consists of 28 parliamentary constituencies from which 28 members of parliament get elected to the Lok Sabha.  Several politicians and bureaucrats from Karnataka have served at the center at various times in different capacities.  Deve Gowda, who hails from Hassan served as the Prime minister of India in 1996. C. K. Jaffer Sharief from Chitradurga is a veteran Congressman and 9-time MP and former Minister of Railways of Government of India. B. D. Jatti from Bijapur served as the Vice President and also as acting President in the past. S.Nigalingappa from Chitradurga was Congress I president.

Members of Parliament

Lok Sabha

Rajya Sabha

Elections

Chief ministers

Deputy ministers

Political parties

State parties

Other parties

Alliances

INC+JDS

Political crisis

2011 Karnataka political crisis

2019 Karnataka political crisis

Civic organizations
There are several organizations like BPAC (Bangalore Political Action Committee) which help in the civic administration of Bangalore. These organizations are formed by responsible citizens of India like Narayana Murthy (founder of InfoSys), Kiran Mazumdar-Shaw (Biocon), Nooraine Fazal (educationist) etc. These organizations help in creating social awareness programs, forming transparency in governance, raise voice against corruption, funding for candidates and strive towards the welfare of Citizens.

See also 
 Elections in Karnataka
 Government of Karnataka
 Karnataka Legislative Assembly

References

External links